Onar Selmer Onarheim (15 October 1910 –  2 April 1988) was a Norwegian politician for the Conservative Party. He was born in Kvinnherad.

Onarheim served in the position of deputy representative to the Norwegian Parliament from Hordaland, during the terms 1961–1965 and 1965–1969. From August to September 1963, he served as the Minister of Fisheries during the short-lived centre-right cabinet Lyng.

Onarheim was a member of Stord municipality council from 1947 to 1964 and 1979 to 1983, serving as mayor since 1954 and deputy mayor in 1982–1983.

Onar Onarheim had two adopted children, Onar Onarheim Jr. and Torunn Onarheim Staurset.

References

1910 births
1988 deaths
Conservative Party (Norway) politicians
Members of the Storting
Government ministers of Norway
Hordaland politicians
People from Kvinnherad